Agostino Bausa, O.P. (23 February 1821 – 14 April 1899) – born Antonio Vincenzo Giuseppe Bausa – was an Italian cardinal of the Roman Catholic Church. A member of the Dominican Order, he served as Archbishop of Florence from 1889 to 1899.

Biography 

Antonio Vincenzo Giuseppe Bausa Bausa was born in Florence, Grand Duchy of Tuscany in present Italy, on 23 February 1821.

Bausa was raised to the rank of cardinal by Pope Leo XIII on 23 May 1887, at the age of 66. Three days later, he was assigned as a Cardinal Deacon the deaconry of Santa Maria in Domnica.

On 17 January 1882, Bausa was appointed Master of the Sacred Palace. He served in that position until 23 May 1887.

On 11 February 1889, Bausa was appointed Archbishop of Florence and raised to the order of Cardinal Priests with the title of Santa Sabina. On 24 March 1889, he was consecrated as  bishop by Pope Leo XIII, with co-consecrators Archbishop Francesco di Paola Cassetta and Bishop , OSA.

He was a strong opponent of blasphemy and desecration of religious holidays, and strong loyalty to Mary and the Eucharist. He frequently spoke for these causes when visiting parishes and their pastors, as well as by his preaching and his numerous writings.

He died on 15 April 1899 at the age of 78. Bausa's coat of arms adorns a corner of the Archiepiscopal Palace of Florence.

References 

1821 births
1899 deaths
19th-century Italian cardinals
Dominican bishops
Dominican cardinals
Italian Dominicans
Roman Catholic archbishops of Florence
Cardinals created by Pope Leo XIII
19th-century Italian Roman Catholic archbishops